Donna Lynn Chesus Crisp (born 1949) is a retired two-star rear admiral, having served over 30 years in the United States Navy.

Naval career 

In 1974, Crisp was commissioned an ensign at Officer Candidate School in Newport, RI. Her early career included positions at Naval District of Washington as protocol officer and public affairs officer; security, communications, and public affairs positions at Pearl Harbor, HI; manpower and personnel department head in the 3rd Fleet; weapons control and air traffic control program project officer at Fleet Combat Direction Systems Support Activity in San Diego, California.

She was promoted to rear admiral in 2001.  After that, Crisp was director of manpower and personnel readiness for the Joint Chiefs of Staff chairman in Washington, DC. during Operation Enduring Freedom and Operation Iraqi Freedom.  Between 2002 and 2004, she was stationed in Oahu with the Navy's Pacific Fleet.  In January 2008, she assumed the position of commander of the Joint Prisoner of War/Missing in Action Accounting Command (JPAC).  In that role she represented U.S. government in POW/MIA negotiations with foreign governments and testified before the U.S. Congress. Two videos of her testimonies in 2008 and 2009 are available on the C-SPAN network. The mission of JPAC was to fully account for U.S. servicemembers who were lost during previous conflicts.

Other activities 
Crisp is a member of the Daughters of the American Revolution and serves as its national vice-chair of the Commemorative Events Committee.  Her focus is the World War I Centennial/Treaty of Versailles. Crisp is also serving as the National Vice Chair of Vivian's Outreach to Women a new program which supports indigent and homeless women that launched June 2019.

Early life 
Crisp was born in Bay Shore, New York, and grew up in Redlands, California. She attended Redlands High School and later graduated from California State University in Long Beach, CA.

Education 
 Bachelor of Arts degree from California State University, Long Beach, CA.
 Strategic Studies, National War College, Washington, D.C.

Awards 
 Secretary of Defense Reengineering Excellence award
 Defense Superior Service Medal with one oak leaf cluster
 Legion of Merit with three gold stars
 Meritorious Service Medal with two gold stars
 Navy Commendation Medal
 Navy Achievement Medal
– Source:

References 

1949 births
Living people
California State University, Long Beach alumni
National War College alumni
Female admirals of the United States Navy
United States Navy rear admirals (upper half)
21st-century American women